The Claiborne Kinnard House also known as Windermere is a historic home in Franklin, Tennessee, built in 1887 on land that was once the eastern flank of the 1864 Battle of Franklin. A 1988 study of Williamson County historical resources assessed that this house was one of the "best two-story vernacular I-House examples" in the county;  the others highly rated were the William King House, the Alpheus Truett House, the Thomas Brown House, the Beverly Toon House, and the Stokely Davis House. 
The house was listed on the National Register of Historic Places in 1988. It is located in Franklin at the corner of Lewisburg Pike and Carnton Lane (now the Heath Place subdivision). 

The land was originally owned by John McGavock who lived at nearby Carnton Plantation. He willed  to his daughter Harriet (Hattie) and her husband, George L. Cowan who built the  house in 1887. It had various unofficial names in the 20th century but the earliest was "Windermere" which is the name preferred by the 21st century owners. When Kinnard died in 1966, the property went to his son Claiborne H. Kinnard Jr. The Kinnard family built a large swimming pool on the property, a business venture  known as "Willow Plunge" which was very popular and remained in business from 1924 to 1967.

See also
Claiborne H. Kinnard Jr.
Willow Plunge

References

Central-passage houses in Tennessee
Houses completed in 1850
Houses in Franklin, Tennessee
Houses on the National Register of Historic Places in Tennessee
Neoclassical architecture in Tennessee
National Register of Historic Places in Williamson County, Tennessee